OMNI is an encryption device manufactured by L-3 Communications. It adds secure voice and secure data to any standard analog telephone or modem connected computer.

SCIP signalling allows interoperability with other SCIP devices such as the Secure Terminal Equipment (STE) phone. In bypass mode, STU-IIIs can communicate with one another using the OMNI to enhance the quality of the voice and data. Algorithms used by the OMNI include Type 1 encryption methods and is able to handle communications up to Top Secret SCI.

Models
 The Standard model is limited to a 56 kbit/s.
 The Xi upgrade allows data rates up to 2 Mbit/s.

References

External links
 L-3 OMNI Web Site
L-3 Voice Transmitter website

Encryption devices